is a Japanese footballer currently playing as a forward for Roasso Kumamoto.

Career statistics

Club
.

Notes

References

1999 births
Living people
Association football people from Yamaguchi Prefecture
Komazawa University alumni
Japanese footballers
Association football forwards
J2 League players
Roasso Kumamoto players